Sophia Laukli (born 8 June 2000) is an American cross-country skier from Yarmouth, Maine. Her highest World Cup finish was third in the freestyle 10km event at Val di Fiemme on January 8, 2023. She previously skied for the Middlebury College ski team, where she earned All-American honors placing second in the 5k freestyle, and now races for the University of Utah ski team. She was named in the United States Ski Team for the 2022 Winter Olympics in Beijing.
Laukli has dual citizenship through her Norwegian father and is said to speak fluent Norwegian.

Cross-country skiing results
All results are sourced from the International Ski Federation (FIS).

Olympic Games

World Championships

World Cup

Season standings

Individual podiums
 1 podium – (1 )

References

External links
 
 

2000 births
Living people
People from Yarmouth, Maine
21st-century American women
Cross-country skiers from Maine
American female cross-country skiers
Cross-country skiers at the 2022 Winter Olympics
Tour de Ski skiers
University of Utah alumni